"Coming Home" is a song by UK garage producer K-Warren featuring singer Lee-O on vocals. It was released as a single and reached the UK top 40 in April 2001, peaking at No. 32 on the UK Singles Chart. The song also reached No. 1 on the UK Dance Singles Chart.

Track listing
UK 12"
A. "Coming Home" (K-Warren Remix) - 5:57
B1. "Coming Home" (Hackney Soldiers Remix) - 4:56
B2. "Coming Home" (Reach & Spin Remix) - 5:50

Charts

References

2000 songs
2001 singles
UK garage songs
Go! Beat singles